Harold Powell (1875 in The Mumbles – 1954)  was a British entomologist who specialised in Lepidoptera.

Harold Powell  was a pharmacist. For part of his life he lived in Hyeres. He collaborated with Charles Oberthur notably on Faune des Lepidopteres de la Barbarie. Etudes de Lepidopterologie comparee, part 10, p. 1-459. Rennes, 1914.

His collection of Lepidoptera from Morocco is held by Service de la Défense des Cultures, Rabat. He was a Fellow of the Royal Entomological Society.

Selected works

Powell, H., 1909 Notes on the early stages and habits of Pieris manni, Mayer. Ent.Rec. : 37-40
Powell, H.,1914 Note sur I'abondance de certains Lepidopteres au Maroc au Printemps et en Été 1914. Rev. france. Lepid. vol.11: pagination ? June 1914
Powell, H., 1914. [Sur les mœurs de Satyrus Semele (Algirica)]. In : Oberthur, C. : Faune des Lépidoptères de la Barbarie.Étud. Lép. comp. 10 : 135-138 (and other parts of the same work)
Powell, H. 1911. Documents concernant les Somabrachys (famille des Megalopygidae). In Etud. Lepid. Comp., 5:227-301, pi. 84–85, A-D. Rennes C. Oberthur

See also
Walter Rothschild, 1920 Supplemental notes to Mr. Charles Oberthur's Faune des Lepidopteres de la Barbarie, with lists of the specimens in the Tring Museum Novitates Zoologicae Tring 27: 1-127 (1920) online. Together these remained the only comprehensive work on the butterflies of the Maghreb until 1996- John Tennent The Butterflies of Morocco, Algeria and Tunisia

References
R. E. E. 1955: [Powell, H.] The Entomologist, London 88 (1101)
Rungs, C. E. E. 1954: [Powell, H.] Bulletin de la Société des Sciences Naturelles et Physiques du Maroc, Rabat 34, S. 110

External links
 Etudes de Lepidopterologie comparee Text  
 Etudes de Lepidopterologie comparee Plates

1875 births
1954 deaths
British entomologists
French lepidopterists
British lepidopterists